Calochortus pulchellus is a rare species of flowering plant in the lily family known by the common name Mt. Diablo fairy-lantern or Mount Diablo globelily.

Calochortus pulchellus is endemic to California, where it is mainly restricted to Mount Diablo of the Diablo Range, in Contra Costa County of the eastern San Francisco Bay Area. There are historical occurrences in the North California Coast Ranges, within Marin, Solano, Napa, and Humboldt Counties.

It grows in chaparral and woodland habitats, currently only known on the bayside−western slopes of Mount Diablo.

Description
Calochortus pulchellus is a perennial herb growing a branching stem up to about 30 centimeters tall. The basal leaf is up to 40 centimeters long and does not wither at flowering; there are 2 or 3 smaller leaves farther up the stem.

The inflorescence is a solitary flower or a cluster of several flowers, which are nodding and usually spherical with all their petal tips touching. The three sepals and three petals are 2 or 3 centimeters long and pale to deep yellow. The petals are thinly hairy inside and often fringed with yellow hairs.

The fruit is a winged capsule 2-3 centimeters in length.

formerly included
Calochortus pulchellus var. amabilis, now called Calochortus amabilis 
Calochortus pulchellus var. maculosus, now called Calochortus amabilis 
Calochortus pulchellus var. parviflorus, now called Calochortus monophyllus

References

External links
 Calflora Database: Calochortus pulchellus (Mount Diablo globelily,  Mt. Diablo fairy lantern)
Jepson Manual (TJM93) Treatment of Calochortus pulchellus
United States Department of Agriculture Plants Profile for Calochortus pulchellus (Mt. Diablo fairy-lantern)
Flora of North America, Calochortus pulchellus
Contra Costa County Report: Mt. Diablo fairy-lantern
U.C. Calphotos gallery of Calochortus pulchellus

pulchellus
Endemic flora of California
Natural history of the California chaparral and woodlands
Natural history of the California Coast Ranges
Natural history of Contra Costa County, California
Mount Diablo
Diablo Range
Taxa named by George Bentham
Endemic flora of the San Francisco Bay Area